Aldisa tara is a species of sea slug, a dorid nudibranch, a marine gastropod mollusk in the family Cadlinidae.

Distribution 
This species was described from British Columbia, Canada.

Ecology
Aldisa tara feeds on a red Hymedesmiid sponge, a Hamigera sp.

Etymology
The name tara refers to the Hill of Tara, the mythological seat of the high-kings of Ireland.

References

Cadlinidae
Gastropods described in 1984